The first parliaments date back to the Middle Ages. In 930, the first assembly of the Alþingi was convened at  Þingvellir in Iceland, becoming the earliest version of a formalized parliamentary system. It was a combination of national assembly, court of justice and yearly cerebration, where the most powerful leaders, called goðar, met to decide on legislation and dispense justice, with the whole community in attendance.

In 1188 Alfonso IX, King of Leon (in current day Spain) convened the three states in the Cortes of León and according to UNESCO it was the first sample of modern parliamentarism in the history of Europe, with the presence of the common people through elected representatives.
 
An early example of parliamentary government developed in today's Netherlands and Belgium during the Dutch revolt (1581), when the sovereign, legislative and executive powers were taken over by the States General of the Netherlands from the then-monarch, King Philip II of Spain. The modern concept of parliamentary government was further developed in the Kingdom of England (1688).

Proto-parliamentary institutions 
Since ancient times, when societies were tribal, there were councils or a headman whose decisions were assessed by village elders. This is often referred to as tribalism. Some scholars argue that in ancient Mesopotamia there was a primitive democratic government where the kings were assessed by council. The same has been said about ancient India, where some form of assemblies existed, and therefore there was some form of democracy. However, these claims are not accepted by most scholars, who see these forms of government as oligarchies.

Iran 
The first recorded signs of a council to decide on different issues in ancient Iran dates back to 247 BC, the time of the Parthian Empire. Parthians established the first Iranian empire since the conquest of Persia by Alexander and by their early years of reigning, an assembly of the nobles called “Mehestan” was formed that made the final decision on very serious issues.

The word "Mehestan" consists of two parts: "Meh", a word of the old Persian origin, which literally means "The Great" and "-stan", a suffix in the Persian language, which means “place”. Altogether Mehestan means a place where the greats come together.

The Mehestan Assembly, which consisted of Zoroastrian religious leaders and clan elders exerted great influence over the administration of the kingdom.

One of the most important decisions of the council was made in 208 AD, when a civil war broke out and the Mehestan decided that the empire would be ruled by two brothers simultaneously, Ardavan V and Blash V. In 224 AD, following the dissolution of the Parthian empire after over 470 years, the Mahestan council came to an end.

Islamic World 
Some Muslim scholars argue that the Islamic shura (a method of taking decisions in Islamic societies) is analogous to the parliament. However, others (notably from Hizb ut-Tahrir) disagree, highlighting some fundamental differences between the shura system and the parliamentary system.

Europe 
Ancient Athens was the cradle of democracy. The Athenian assembly (ἐκκλησία ekklesia) was the most important institution, and every male of Athenian citizenship above the age of thirty could take part in the discussions; however, no women, no men under the age of thirty, and none of the many thousands of slaves were allowed to participate. However, Athenian democracy was not representative, but rather direct, and therefore the ekklesia was not a parliamentary system.

The Roman republic, established in the 6th century BC, had legislative assemblies, who had the final say regarding the election of magistrates, the enactment of new statutes, the carrying out of capital punishment, the declaration of war and peace, and the creation (or dissolution) of alliances. The Roman Senate was not the ancestor or predecessor of modern parliamentarism in any sense, because the Roman senate was not a legislative body. The Roman Senate controlled money, administration, and the details of foreign policy.

In Anglo-Saxon England, the Witenagamot was an important political institution. The name derives from the Old English ƿitena ȝemōt, or witena gemōt, for "meeting of wise men". The first recorded act of a witenagemot was the law code issued by King Æthelberht of Kent ca. 600, the earliest document which survives in sustained Old English prose; however, the witan was certainly in existence long before this time. The Witan, along with the folkmoots (local assemblies), is an important ancestor of the modern English parliament.

Early parliaments in the Middle Ages 
The first parliamentary bodies involving representatives of the urban middle class were summoned in 12th century Spain. In 1187, the Leonese King Alfonso IX summoned representatives of the nobility, the church, and representatives of the 50 most important cities, to a council in San Esteban de Gormaz, Soria. There was another meeting with representatives of the cities in Carrión de los Condes, Palencia, the next year, which institutionalized the Curiae. There had been other meetings previously, such as the Concilium of 1135, but they were exceptional and not leading to a regular attendance of town representatives. According to the UNESCO Memory of the World Programme, this is the earliest documented manifestation of the European parliamentary system with some temporal continuity.

The Cortes of León from year 1188 was a parliamentary body in the medieval Kingdom of León. After coming to power, King Alfonso IX, potentially facing an attack by his two neighbours, Castile and Portugal, decided to summon the "Royal Curia". This was a medieval organisation composed of aristocrats and bishops but because of the seriousness of the situation and the need to maximise political support, Alfonso IX took the decision to also call the representatives of the urban middle class from the most important cities of the kingdom to the assembly. León's Cortes dealt with matters like the right to private property, the inviolability of domicile, the right to appeal to justice opposite the King and the obligation of the King to consult the Cortes before entering a war.

The second oldest recorded parliamentary body in Europe were the Portuguese Cortes of 1254 held in Leiria in 1254. These included burgher delegates and introduced the monetagio system, a fixed sum to be paid by burghers to the Crown. Property rights of the king and his subjects, as well as of ecclesiastical bodies, were addressed in the previous Cortes of Coimbra in 1211 (which included members of the nobility and the clergy). The Portuguese Cortes met again in 1256, 1261 and 1273 under Afonso III of Portugal, always by royal summon.

In the realms of the Crown of Aragon, the institutional system effectively limited powers of the monarchs. Particularly, in the Principality of Catalonia, in 1283, the Catalan Courts (Corts Catalanes) became one of the first parliamentary bodies of Europe that officially banned the royal power to create legislation unilaterally. Along the next centuries, the Courts developed an extensive regulation of its internal operation and guarantee of rights for the citizenship; in 1481, the Catalan Courts approved the Constitució de l'Observança, which established the submission of the king and its officers to the laws of the Principality.

In England, Simon de Montfort is remembered as one of the fathers of representative government for holding two famous parliaments. The first, in 1258, stripped the King of unlimited authority and the second, in 1265, included ordinary citizens from the towns.

Britain and the Commonwealth
In the 17th century, the Parliament of England pioneered some of the ideas and systems of liberal democracy culminating in the Glorious Revolution and passage of the Bill of Rights 1689. The Glorious Revolution marked the beginning of the English constitutional monarchy and its role as one of the three elements of parliament.

In the Kingdom of Great Britain, the monarch, in theory, chaired cabinet and chose ministers. In practice, King George I's inability to speak English led the responsibility for chairing cabinet to go to the leading minister, literally the prime or first minister, Robert Walpole. The gradual democratisation of parliament with the broadening of the voting franchise increased parliament's role in controlling government, and in deciding who the king could ask to form a government. By the 19th century, the Great Reform Act of 1832 led to parliamentary dominance, with its choice invariably deciding who was prime minister and the complexion of the government.

Other countries gradually adopted what came to be called the Westminster model of government, with an executive answerable to parliament (fusion of powers), but exercising powers nominally vested in the head of state, in the name of the head of state. Hence the use of phrases like Her Majesty's government or His Excellency's government. Such a system became particularly prevalent in older British dominions, many of whom had their constitutions enacted by the British parliament; examples include Australia, New Zealand, Canada, the Irish Free State and the Union of South Africa. Some of these parliaments evolved, were reformed from, or were initially developed as distinct from their original British model: the Australian Senate, for instance, has since its inception more closely reflected the US Senate than the British House of Lords; whereas since 1950 there is no upper house in New Zealand.

France: swinging between presidential and parliamentary systems
France swung between different styles of presidential, semi-presidential and parliamentary systems of government; parliamentary systems under Louis XVIII, Charles X, the July Monarchy under Louis Philippe, King of the French and the Third Republic and Fourth Republic, though the extent of full parliamentary control differed in each, from one extreme under Charles X (a strong head of state) to full parliamentary control (under the Third Republic). Napoleon III offered attempts at some degree of parliamentary control of the executive, though few regarded his regime as genuinely parliamentary and democratic. A presidential system existed under the short-lived Second Republic. The modern Fifth Republic system combines aspects of presidentialism and parliamentarianism.

Parliamentarism in France differed from parliamentarism in the United Kingdom in several ways.  First, the French National Assembly had more power over the cabinet than the British Parliament had over its cabinet.  Second, France had shorter lived premierships.  In the seventy years of the Third Republic, France had over fifty premierships.

In 1980 Maurice Duverger claimed that the Fifth Republic was a government in which the president was supreme, a virtual king.  More recent analyses of France's system have downgraded the importance of the French president.  During cohabitation, when the National Assembly of France and presidency are controlled by opposite parties, the French president is rather weak.  Thus, some scholars see the French system as not one that is half presidential and half parliamentary, but as one that alternates between presidentialism and parliamentarism.

Spread of parliamentarism in Europe
19th-century urbanisation, industrial revolution and, modernism fueled the political left's struggle for democracy and parliamentarism. Democracy and parliamentarism became increasingly prevalent in Europe in the years after World War I, partially imposed by the democratic victors, Great Britain and France, on the defeated countries and their successors, notably Germany's Weimar Republic and the new Austrian Republic. In the radicalised times at the end of World War I, democratic reforms were often seen as a means to counter popular revolutionary currents. Thus established democratic regimes suffered however from limited popular support, in particular from the political right.

Another obstacle was the political parties' unpreparedness for long-term commitments to coalition cabinets in the multi-party democracies on the European continent. The resulting  "Minority-Parliamentarism" led to frequent defeats in votes of confidence and almost perpetual political crisis which further diminished the standing of democracy and parliamentarism in the eyes of the electorate.

Many early 20th-century regimes failed through political instability and/or the interventions of heads of state, notably King Victor Emmanuel III of Italy's failure to back his government when facing the threat posed by Benito Mussolini in 1922, or the support given by King Alfonso XIII of Spain to a prime minister using dictatorial powers in the 1920s. Finland is sometimes given as a counter-example, where a presidential democracy was established after a failed revolution and more than three months of bitter Civil War in Finland (1918). In 1932 the Lapua Movement attempted a coup d'état, aiming at the exclusion of Social Democrats from political power, but the Conservative President Svinhufvud maintained his democratic government. Parliamentarism was (re-)introduced by Svinhufvud's successor Kyösti Kallio in 1937.

See also
 Democratisation § Historical cases
 History of democracy
 List of democracy and elections-related topics
 List of political systems in France
 Parliament
 Parliament in the Making
 Parliamentary system
 Prime minister
 Parliamentary sovereignty
 Sejm of the Polish–Lithuanian Commonwealth
 The History of Parliament

References

External links
History of Parliament

Political systems